Achthophora sandakana is a species of beetle in the family Cerambycidae. It was described by Heller in 1924. It is known from Borneo and Malaysia.

References

Lamiini
Beetles described in 1924